Tomahawk, Alberta is a hamlet in Alberta, Canada within Parkland County. It is located on Highway 759, northeast of the Town of Drayton Valley.

The hamlet is located in Census Division No. 11 and in the federal riding of Yellowhead.

History 
During the fall of 1902 lumberjacks Ed Martin, Chas. (Charles) Lindell, John Kelly, and John L. Croppley scouted along an old pack trail for land.  They returned with reports of good land.  In March 1903 the first European settlers arrived, traveling along the same trail.  In July of the same year the first woman arrived.  The original building for Tomahawk School was constructed in 1909.

Demographics 

Economy 
Tomahawk's economy is largely agricultural, though it does profit from the oil and gas industry.

Businesses within Tomahawk include a gas station, a general store, an agricultural dealership, a restaurant, a butcher, a liquor store, and a hotel with a bar.

Education 
Just west of Tomahawk is a K-9 school named Tomahawk School.  The school has a student population of 125 (as of 2012) and a teaching staff of 9 with 6 other support staff.  The school is also the location of a public library, that is part of the TracPac Library System.

Specific information on Tomahawk School is available:

Notable people 
Rudolph "Rusty" Zander – Canadian politician, Progressive Conservative MLA (1971-1979)
Beth Bieda - Big Brother Canada Season 9 Contestant

See also 
List of communities in Alberta
List of designated places in Alberta
List of hamlets in Alberta

References 

Designated places in Alberta
Hamlets in Alberta
Parkland County